Longworth Peak, is a 2,094-metre (6,870-feet) mountain in the Dezaiko Range of the Hart Ranges in Northern British Columbia.

Located between the Fraser River and the Torpy River, the peak is rocky with no glaciers. It is the highest point in the Dezaiko Range.  

The peak rises above the unincorporated hamlet of Longworth, BC and is a popular hiking destination.  There is an abandoned fire lookout near the summit.  

The BC Ministry of Environment operates an automated snow weather station on the south west side of the mountain at an elevation of 1,740m which was installed in 2016.

References 

Canadian Rockies
Northern Interior of British Columbia
Peace River Land District